Deep Cuts, Volume 1 (1973–1976) is a compilation of Queen tracks between 1973 and 1976. Unlike other compilations released by Queen, Deep Cuts contains songs which are largely not as well known as Queen's hits. The album was released on 14 March 2011 as part of Queen's 40th anniversary. Deep Cuts Volume 1 was released at the same time Queen's first five albums (Queen, Queen II, Sheer Heart Attack, A Night at the Opera, and A Day at the Races) were re-released. The songs picked were all personal favourite songs, that were not hits, selected by Brian May, Roger Taylor, and Taylor Hawkins (the drummer for the Foo Fighters). It is the only release to feature the complete ending of "The March of The Black Queen" (on Queen II it segues to "Funny How Love Is") and of "Ogre Battle" (on Queen II it segues to "The Fairy Feller's Master-Stroke"). The three songs "Tenement Funster", "Flick of the Wrist" and "Lily of the Valley" all segue into each other just as on the original Sheer Heart Attack album.

Track listing

Personnel
Freddie Mercury: lead and backing vocals, piano.
Brian May: guitars, lead vocals on "39", "Long Away" and "Good Company", vocal bridge on "Keep Yourself Alive", backing vocals, ukulele, bells.
Roger Taylor: drums, percussion, lead vocals on "Tenement Funster" and "I'm in Love with My Car", vocal line in "The March of the Black Queen", vocal bridge on "Keep Yourself Alive".
John Deacon: bass guitar, acoustic guitar.

Charts

References 

2011 compilation albums
Queen (band) compilation albums
Island Records compilation albums
Virgin Records compilation albums
Universal Music Group compilation albums